Patricia Preciado Martin (born July 6, 1939) is an author and researcher who specializes in oral history and the history of Arizona. She was one of the first to document, write and share stories of Mexican Americans in Tucson, Arizona.

Biography 
Preciado Martin was born in Prescott, Arizona in 1939. At the age of three, she and her family moved to Tucson. In 1960, Preciado Martin received her bachelor's degree in education from the University of Arizona.

In the early 1960s, she was a volunteer in the Peace Corps, where she served in British Honduras (now known as Belize). From 1979 to 1983, Preciado Martin was a member of the research team that collected photographs and oral histories directly from Tucson's Mexican American community; this project, the Mexican Heritage Project, was a collaboration worked with the Arizona Historical Society to save stories about the Tucson's Mexican American community.

Work and writings 
Preciado Martin is known for her work collecting oral histories from older Mexican-Americans. She has spoken about discrimination against Mexican-American women, and works to share stories of her heritage in order to keep it from becoming "homogenized". Preciado Martin has worked with photographers to combine oral histories with pictures of Arizona residents and Mexican American families. In her 1992 book, Songs My Mother Sang to Me: An Oral History of Mexican American Women, she shared interviews of Arizona-area Mexican-American women who present different pasts. In 2000, her book, Amor Eterno: Eleven Lessons in Love, shared the story of a woman who prayed for her son's return from war. Her 2016 book, El Milagro and Other Stories, was adapted into a shadow play presented in Tucson in 2016.

Selected publications 

Reviewed by the Journal of Arizona History.

The book was reviewed by publications centered on women and American history.

The book was reviewed by the popular press.

Reviewed by Southwestern Historical Quarterly and Agricultural History

Reviewed by the Journal of Arizona History

Awards and honors 
In 1997, Preciado Martin was named by the Arizona Library Association as Arizona Author of the Year in 1997. She received the Arizona Humanities Council Distinguished Public Scholar Award of Excellence in 2000. She has also received an award from the Mujer 2000 committee and the University of Arizona Hispanic Alumni Association. In 2001, she received the Southwest Book Award. In 2003, she delivered the Lawrence Clark Powell lecture, and in 2005 she received the Sharlot Hall award.

References

External links 

Living people
American women writers
Oral historians
American writers of Mexican descent
University of Arizona alumni
1939 births